is a Japanese leading manufacturer of automatic test equipment (ATE) for the semiconductor industry, and a manufacturer of measuring instruments used in the design, production and maintenance of electronic systems including fiber optic and wireless communications equipment and digital consumer products. Based in Tokyo, Advantest produces Memory, SoC and RF test systems.

History 

Advantest was founded in Japan in 1954 as Takeda Riken Industry Co., Ltd., and was a maker of electronic measuring instruments.  The company entered the semiconductor testing business in 1972, began trading on the Tokyo Stock Exchange in 1983 and changed its name to Advantest Corporation in 1985. The company’s stock began trading on the New York Stock Exchange in 2001.

Expanding its semiconductor test business, Advantest established its North American subsidiary, Advantest America, in 1982, and its European operations in Munich in 1983, to locate its sales and service operations closer to its North American and European customers. The company also has subsidiaries throughout Asia and operates in 13 countries. With the integration with Verigy completed, the company currently has approximately 4,500 employees worldwide.

In 2002, Advantest was one of the founding member companies that established the Semiconductor Test Consortium (STC)—the first international, industry-wide collaboration aimed at developing a highly scalable, flexible test platform to reduce the cost of test of SoCs and other advanced ICs that incorporate complex technologies such as copper interconnects, sub-100 nm device geometries and 300mm wafers.

Astronics Corporation sold their semiconductor test business to Advantest in 2018 for $185 million.

Products
Advantest has three reportable segments of business:  semiconductor and component test systems; mechatronics (handlers); and services, support and others.

References

External links
 Advantest
 Advantest Japan
  Wiki collection of bibliographic works on Advantest

Manufacturing companies based in Tokyo
Electronics companies established in 1954
Companies listed on the Tokyo Stock Exchange
Electronics companies of Japan
Electronic test equipment manufacturers
Companies formerly listed on the New York Stock Exchange
Instrument-making corporations
Technology companies of Japan
Japanese brands
Furukawa Group
Japanese companies established in 1954